The 2015 FIM Moto2 World Championship was a part of the 67th F.I.M. Road Racing World Championship season. Marc VDS Racing Team rider Tito Rabat started the season as the defending riders' champion, having won his first championship title in 2014.

Rabat had been trailing by 78 points going to the Japanese Grand Prix. However, he had to withdraw from the event with a fractured left radius. Therefore, Johann Zarco became World Champion – the ninth different world champion in the intermediate class in as many years. Ajo Motorsport rider Zarco won eight races during the season – to become the most successful French rider in Grand Prix racing – and with a tally of 352 points, set a record points total for the intermediate class; surpassing Rabat's 346 from 2014. With Rabat missing three races due to injury, rookie Álex Rins (Pons Racing) moved ahead in the standings, and despite Rabat winning the final race in Valencia, Rins finished second to seal the runner-up spot by three points. Rins won two races at Indianapolis, and Phillip Island, while Rabat added his Valencia success to wins at Mugello and Motorland Aragón.

On one of the few non-Kalex motorcycles on the grid, Sam Lowes finished fourth in the championship for Speed Up, taking a race win at Circuit of the Americas, holding off Derendinger Racing Interwetten's Thomas Lüthi, who won at Le Mans. The season's only other race winners were Jonas Folger, who won at Losail and Jerez for the AGR Team, and Xavier Siméon, who took his first win for Gresini Racing at the Sachsenring. Kalex comfortably won the manufacturers' championship; they won 17 of the season's 18 races, with only Lowes' success at Circuit of the Americas stopping a clean sweep of victories. Speed Up finished second in the championship, with 209 points to Kalex's 445.

The 2015 season was the last year that Eni was the sole fuel supplier for Moto2, as Total became the championship's fuel supplier in 2016.

Calendar

The Fédération Internationale de Motocyclisme released an 18-race official calendar on 26 September 2014.

 ‡ = Night race
 †† = Saturday race

Calendar changes
 The British Grand Prix had been scheduled to return to Donington Park for the first time since 2009, ahead of a planned move to the brand-new Circuit of Wales in 2016. However, Donington Park pulled out of hosting the event on 10 February 2015, citing financial delays.

Teams and riders
A provisional entry list was released by the Fédération Internationale de Motocyclisme on 23 October 2014. An updated entry list was released on 2 February 2015. All Moto2 competitors raced with an identical CBR600RR inline-four engine developed by Honda. Teams competed with tyres supplied by Dunlop.

Rider changes
 Álex Rins moved up to Moto2 with Páginas Amarillas HP 40, filling the seat vacated by Maverick Viñales who moved up to MotoGP with Team Suzuki Ecstar.
 After competing in the 2014 season with Tech 3 as a replacement rider, Ricard Cardús moved to a full-time ride with Tech 3.
 Lorenzo Baldassarri left Gresini Racing at the end of the 2014 season to join Forward Racing.
 Mika Kallio left Marc VDS Racing Team at the end of the 2014 season to join Italtrans Racing. Kallio's place at Marc VDS was taken by 2014 Moto3 winner Álex Márquez.
 Randy Krummenacher left IodaRacing Project at the end of the 2014 season to join JiR.
 Johann Zarco rode for Ajo Motorsport.
 Jesko Raffin made a full-time debut to Moto2 with SAG Team. Replacing Louis Rossi who joined to Tasca Racing Scuderia Moto2.
 Zaqhwan Zaidi made his Moto2 debut, joining JPMoto Malaysia.
 Julián Simón moved from Italtrans to QMMF Racing.
 Florian Alt made his Moto2 debut, joining IodaRacing Project.
 Jordi Torres, Nicolás Terol, and Román Ramos left Moto2 for Superbike World Championship.

Results and standings

Grands Prix

Riders' standings
Scoring system
Points were awarded to the top fifteen finishers. A rider had to finish the race to earn points.

Constructors' standings
Points were awarded to the top fifteen finishers. A rider had to finish the race to earn points.

 Each constructor got the same number of points as their best placed rider in each race.

References

External links
 The official website of Grand Prix motorcycle racing

Moto2
Grand Prix motorcycle racing seasons